Gefle IF is a Swedish sports club located in Gävle, with several sections:

 Gefle IF, football section
 Gefle IF Budo, budō section
 Gefle IF Friidrott, athletics section
 Gefle IF Gång och vandring, race walking and hiking section
 Gefle IF Handikappidrott, handicap sports section